Enid Bakewell  ( Turton; born 16 December 1940) played for the English women's cricket team in 12 Tests between 1968 and 1979, and in 23 one-day international matches. A right-handed batter and slow left-arm orthodox bowler, on her figures she has a strong claim to be regarded as the best all-rounder that the English women's game has produced. In Tests she scored 1,078 runs at an average of 59.88, with 4 centuries, as well as taking 50 wickets at an average of 16.62.  In what proved to be her final Test, she scored 68 and 112* (out of an England total of 164) and took 10 for 75 (including career-best figures in the second innings of 7-61) against West Indies at Edgbaston in 1979. Her final WODI appearance was in the final of the 1982 Women's Cricket World Cup.

She, along with Lynne Thomas, set the record for the highest opening run partnership in the history of Women's Cricket World Cup (246).

In 2014 Wisden Cricketers' Almanack selected her as one of the five greatest female players of all time.

Early life
Bakewell was born in Newstead Village, Nottinghamshire.  She was encouraged to play cricket from an early age.  She was educated at the primary school in Newstead and at Brincliffe County Grammar School, Nottingham.  After playing for a local club, Notts Casuals WCC, she started to play for the Nottinghamshire county women's team aged 14.  She initially concentrated on her batting but was encouraged to develop her slow left-arm bowling, which she modelled on Tony Lock.

She studied at Dartford College of Physical Education, graduating in 1959.  She married Colin Bakewell, an electrical engineer with Rolls-Royce.  Their daughter was born in 1966.

Cricket career
Bakewell was considered for selection for the Test tour to Australia in 1963.  She was pregnant and so missed the home Tests against New Zealand in England in 1966.  She joined the 1968–69 tour, playing in all three Tests against Australia and all three Tests against New Zealand.  She opened the batting in her first Test, against Australia in 1968, and made a century on debut, and also scored centuries opening the batting in the first and second Tests against New Zealand in 1969.

Small but quick and athletic, with good footwork,  on the tour she achieved a batting average of 39.60 in 29 innings, and took 118 wickets at a bowling average of 9.70.

In the first ever Women's World Cup competition in 1973, which England won, she scored 118 in the final match against Australia and took 2/28 in 12 overs. She also played, at age 41, in the 1982 Women's Cricket World Cup, taking 3 for 13 against India at Wanganui and then three for 29 against the International XI at Wellington.

She also played in the three Tests at home against Australia in 1973, and the three home Tests against the West Indies in 1979.  At Edgbaston in 1979 she scored 68 in the first innings, carried her bat to score 112 not out in the second innings, and took 10 for 75 in the match (3-14 and 7-61).

International centuries

Test centuries

One Day International centuries

Later life
She continued to play for East Midlands and later Surrey into her 50s. She is an ECB-qualified coach. Bakewell has continued to play cricket into her 80s, and in 2022 she toured Australia with the East Anglian Veteran Ladies team, playing matches against veteran mens' and womens' sides.

Bakewell was inducted into the ICC Cricket Hall of Fame in 2012, becoming the third woman cricketer  to be thus recognized (after Rachel Heyhoe-Flint and Belinda Clark).

She was awarded the MBE in the 2019 New Year Honours.

References

Further reading

External links

Living people
1940 births
People from Newstead, Nottinghamshire
Cricketers from Nottinghamshire
England women Test cricketers
England women One Day International cricketers
East Midlands women cricketers
Surrey women cricketers
Women cricketers who made a century on One Day International debut
Women cricketers who made a century on Test debut
Members of the Order of the British Empire
Recipients of the Sunday Times Sportswomen of the Year Lifetime Achievement Award